Heilmeier is a German surname. Notable people with the surname include:

Franz Heilmeier (born 1930), German sailor
George H. Heilmeier (1936–2014), American engineer and businessman

German-language surnames